Kevin Francis Dwyer (12 February 1929 – 12 July 2020) was a New Zealand cricketer who played seven first-class matches for Auckland in the Plunket Shield.

Dwyer died in Auckland on 12 July 2020.

See also
 List of Auckland representative cricketers

References

1929 births
2020 deaths
New Zealand cricketers
Auckland cricketers
Cricketers from Wellington City